Henry John Seaman (April 16, 1805 – May 3, 1861) was a U.S. Representative from New York.

Biography
He was born on April 16, 1805 in Greenridge, Staten Island. Seaman engaged in agricultural pursuits.
Promoter of Richmond village in 1836.

Seaman was elected as the candidate of the American Party to the Twenty-ninth Congress (March 4, 1845 – March 3, 1847).
He served as director of the Staten Island Railroad in 1851.
Secretary of the Plank Road Co. in 1856.
Constructed the bridge over Fresh Kills.

He died at Marshland, Staten Island on May 3, 1861. He was interred in Woodlawn Cemetery, New York City.

References 

1805 births
1861 deaths
People from Staten Island
Know-Nothing members of the United States House of Representatives from New York (state)
19th-century American politicians